Palaiyanallur is a village in the Kumbakonam taluk of Thanjavur district, Tamil Nadu, India.

Demographics 

As per the 2001 census, Palaiyanallur had a total population of 200 with 102 males and 98 females. The sex ratio was 961. The literacy rate was 76.84

References 

 

Villages in Thanjavur district